Sabir Hussain Qaimkhaniis a Pakistani politician who has been a member of the National Assembly of Pakistan since August 2018. Previously he was a Member of the Provincial Assembly of Sindh, from May 2013 to May 2018.

Early life and education
He was born on 1 August 1970 in Badin.

He has a degree of Bachelor of Engineering in Mechanical Engineering from Mehran University of Engineering and Technology.

Political career

He was elected to the Provincial Assembly of Sindh as a candidate of Mutahida Quami Movement (MQM) from Constituency PS-49 HYDERABAD-V in 2013 Pakistani general election.

He was elected to the National Assembly of Pakistan as a candidate of MQM from Constituency NA-226 (Hyderabad-II) in 2018 Pakistani general election.

External Link

More Reading
 List of members of the 15th National Assembly of Pakistan
 No-confidence motion against Imran Khan

References

Living people
Sindh MPAs 2013–2018
1970 births
People from Badin District
Muttahida Qaumi Movement politicians
Pakistani MNAs 2018–2023